The 1893–94 FA Amateur Cup was the first season of the FA Amateur Cup, an annual football competition for teams outside the professional leagues.

Old Carthusians won the competition, beating Casuals in the final.

Quarter-finals

Semi-finals

Final

References

FA Amateur Cup
FA Amateur Cup
FA Amateur Cup seasons